Rachelle Booth (born 31 August 1995) is an English taekwondo athlete.

In May 2015, Booth competed in the -62kg category in the 2015 World Taekwondo Championships. She made the semi-finals, winning a bronze medal after losing to Mexican, Marta Calvo Gomez. The games were her debut World Championships and came only 18 months after joining the GB taekwondo team.

References

Living people
English female taekwondo practitioners
Sportspeople from Wigan
1995 births
World Taekwondo Championships medalists